Ghosts of Sugar Land is a 2019 documentary film directed by Bassam Tariq, written by Thomas Niles and Bassam Tariq and starring Jennifer Julian and Kc Okoro. The premise revolves around a young American Muslim man, Mark, who converted to Islam and became radicalized, and the reasons for it. The film premiered at the 2019 Sundance Film Festival and was released on October 16, 2019, on Netflix.

Cast
 Jennifer Julian
 Kc Okoro

References

External links
 
 

2019 documentary films
2019 films
American documentary television films
Netflix original documentary films
Sundance Film Festival award winners
2010s English-language films
2010s American films